František Šturma (born 7 August 1972) is a former football player from Czech Republic and a former manager of ŠKF  Sereď.

Honours

Manager
Zemplín Michalovce
DOXXbet liga: Winners: 2014–15 (Promoted)

External links
 MFK Zemplín Michalovce profile

References

1972 births
Living people
People from Nymburk
Czech footballers
Czech football managers
Association footballers not categorized by position
MFK Zemplín Michalovce managers
2. Liga (Slovakia) managers
SK Benátky nad Jizerou managers
Bohemian Football League managers
FK Poprad managers
FK Kolín managers
1. SC Znojmo managers
Czech National Football League managers
FK Baník Sokolov managers
ŠKF iClinic Sereď managers
Slovak Super Liga managers
Expatriate football managers in Slovakia
Czech expatriate sportspeople in Slovakia
Sportspeople from the Central Bohemian Region